Biran Damla Yılmaz (born 28 June 1997) is a Turkish actress and model. She played in many drama series such as Baraj, Canevim and Kırgın Çiçekler.

Education 
After studying at a conservatory, she started her acting career in 2014 while still being a student. Her first notable role, which marked her television debut, was a role in the TV series Yasak. Her breakthrough came when she was cast in the series Kırgın Çiçekler. Ever since she has continued her career both in television and cinema. In 2020, she was cast in a leading role in the series Baraj, an adaptation of the 1977 Turkish movie with the same name.

Filmography

Television

Film

References

External links 
 
 

1997 births
Living people
Turkish television actresses
Turkish film actresses